PODFather Ltd. is a privately held software company based in Edinburgh, Scotland. It develops electronic Proof of Delivery systems for the logistics, field service, healthcare and construction industries.

History 
The company was founded as Valley Technology in 2000 by information technology professional Alastair Broom. 

Valley Technology provided IT services and technical support to UK retail businesses, including several bespoke software systems such as a warehouse management system called .

The initial PODFather product was developed with customer Neil Williams Haulage to solve the problem of lost receipts, launching in 2007.

PODFather soon became the company's core product, with ambitious plans for international growth and use on national construction projects such as Crossrail and Tideway.

In 2017, Cumbria Partnership NHS Foundation Trust deployed PODFather to track transportation of health records.

In 2023, Podfather announced new branding.

Product 
PODFather is a cloud-based software as a service (SaaS) electronic Proof of Delivery system, allowing businesses to manage their operations in real-time, removing the problems associated with paper-based processes.

References

External links 
 

Companies based in Edinburgh
Software companies of Scotland